The Last Movie Star is a 2017 American comedy-drama film written and directed by Adam Rifkin. The film stars Burt Reynolds, Ariel Winter, Clark Duke, Ellar Coltrane and Chevy Chase.

The film had its world premiere at the Tribeca Film Festival on April 22, 2017. It was released through DirecTV Cinema on February 22, 2018, before being released in a limited release and through video on demand on March 30, 2018 by A24.

This is one of Burt Reynolds' latter film appearances before his death in September 2018.

Plot
An aging movie star is invited to a small, local film festival in Nashville. He attends and goes on a journey throughout his past as he faces the fact that his glory days are behind him.

The story begins with Vic Edwards, old, frail, and frustrated trying to perform everyday tasks. Although once a top movie star, he is ignored by an attractive woman while shopping. He has lunch with his friend Sonny and mentions he has been invited to get a lifetime achievement award at film festival in Tennessee. Sonny tells him that this film festival has a great reputation, Clint Eastwood was a recent recipient, and encourages him to go. Thinking it might improve his mood, Vic agrees, but is unpleasantly surprised at the airport that his seat isn't in first class but in coach. Arriving at the airport, he is met by Lil, his assigned personal assistant and driver, who not only doesn't know who he is but hasn't bothered to clean the trash out of the back seat of her dilapidated car.

Vic's irritation is increased when she takes him to a low-budget motel, not the high-class hotel he was expecting. He states that no way did Clint Eastwood stay there. Lil then takes him to the film festival which is run by her brother Doug. There Vic finds out it's not the prestigious film festival that Sonny had mentioned, but a shoe-string festival where the films are shown in the back room of a bar. Vic begins drinking heavily, and although the 30 to 40 people attending are in awe of him, he replies to their questions with contempt, and shortly walks out.

The next day when Lil arrives at the motel to drive him to the festival, Vic insists on being driven to his home town, several hours away in Knoxville, Tennessee. They visit his boyhood home and the football stadium where he played college football. He explains that he started six games as a sophomore during their undefeated season. In the last game, with time running out his team is losing, he scores the winning touchdown but is injured and never able to play again. He doesn't have respect for acting but explains that being a football player is really something to be admired which only adds to his bitterness.

Vic tells Lil that while he was there he fell in love and married his first wife. He dumped her once he started becoming famous. Looking back, he sees that, out of all his wives, she was the only one that loved him for who he was, not just because he was a movie star. They go to a luxury hotel where he is recognized and given a suite. While there, Lil finds out her boyfriend is cheating on her from his social media posts. She wants to confront him, but Vic tells her that if the boyfriend isn't treating her good, he isn't worth it and Vic knows from personal experience. They also go to the nursing home where his first wife lives but they find she suffers from dementia and does not recognize him.

Vic thinks back on his career and imagines himself in his old movies interacting with the characters he played. First in a scene from Smokey and the Bandit and then Deliverance. Thinking of the women he treated badly, Vic decides to see his first wife again. The next morning, they take her out of the nursing home and take her to the college campus where Vic apologizes and asks her to marry him again. She is happy but still doesn't know what is happening. They return to the festival just as the last movie is playing (with scenes from an episode of Gunsmoke). Now more at peace, Vic accepts the award and their praise.

Cast

Production
According to director Adam Rifkin, it took him about seven years to secure financing for the film. Rifkin had written the film with Burt Reynolds specifically in mind for the lead role, with many elements of the main character sharing similarities to Reynolds's personal life. Principal photography began on May 9, 2016. Most of the film was shot in Knoxville, Tennessee.

Scenes from previous Reynolds films Deliverance (1972) and Smokey and the Bandit (1977) were included in the film.

Release
The film premiered under the working title Dog Years at the Tribeca Film Festival on April 22, 2017. On June 14, 2017, A24 and DirecTV Cinema acquired distribution rights to the film. Shortly thereafter, the film's title was changed from Dog Years to The Last Movie Star in a mutual decision between the filmmakers and A24 (who made the suggestion). The film served as the closing-night film at the Palm Springs International Film Festival on January 14, 2018. It was released on February 22, 2018, through DirecTV Cinema before being released in a limited release and through video on demand on March 30, 2018. A red carpet premiere at the Tennessee Theatre in Knoxville happened a day earlier, on March 29.

Reception

Critical response
The Last Movie Star received mostly mixed reviews. On Rotten Tomatoes, the film holds an approval rating of 59% based on 27 reviews, with an average rating of 6.1/10. The website's critics consensus reads, "The Last Movie Star has a few poignant moments thanks to Burt Reynolds and Ariel Winter, but their performances are stranded in a middling drama unworthy of their efforts." On Metacritic, which assigns a weighted average rating to reviews, the film has a score of 46 out of 100, based on 11 critics, indicating "mixed or average reviews".

In a mixed review for NPR, Scott Tobias stated "Though Rifkin's heart is in the right place, there's not a moment in the film that isn't overplayed" and that, "Had Rifkin been willing to dial down the soppiness even a little, there's potential for The Last Movie Star to double as a tribute to Reynolds and a cautionary tale on the perils of fame." A review in Variety states that the movie "never quite transcends such pedestrian execution." Rolling Stone gave the film two out of four stars, calling it an "opportunity missed." In a positive review for RogerEbert.com, Sheila O'Malley gave the film three out of four stars.

Many reviews pointed to Reynolds's performance as a highlight of the film. Referring to Reynolds's performance, a review in the Los Angeles Times stated, "Thanks to its star’s all-in commitment, the overtly maudlin film works better than it should," while a review from Nerd Reactor stated "The Last Movie Star shows us why Burt Reynolds is a legendary actor. It’s just a shame that the rest of the film isn’t as good." Rolling Stone referred to the film as Reynolds's "swan song". The Last Movie Star was one of Reynolds's latter film projects, and he died several months after the film's release.

Accolades
The film, titled as Dog Years, received the Chairman's Award at the 2017 San Diego International Film Festival. It was also named Best International Dramatic Feature at the 2018 Edmonton International Film Festival.

References

External links
The Last Movie Star at AllMovie
The Last Movie Star at Box Office Mojo

The Last Movie Star at Metacritic
The Last Movie Star at Rotten Tomatoes
Dog Years at the TCM Movie Database

2017 films
2017 drama films
2017 independent films
American drama films
Films directed by Adam Rifkin
A24 (company) films
Films about actors
Films about old age
Films set in Nashville, Tennessee
2010s English-language films
2010s American films